Nassella charruana, the lobed needle grass, is a species of bunchgrass in the family Poaceae, native to southern Brazil, Uruguay, and northeastern Argentina, and introduced to Victoria, Australia. As its synonym Stipa charruana it has gained the Royal Horticultural Society's Award of Garden Merit as an ornamental.

References

charruana
Flora of South Brazil
Flora of Uruguay
Flora of Northeast Argentina
Plants described in 1990